Prima Donna is a Dutch cheese brand of Vandersterre Groep. It competes with Parrano, a trademarked brand of Vandersterre's competitor Uniekaas Groep. Like Parrano it combines the flavour of aged Italian Parmesan with the pliant texture of Dutch Gouda cheese.

References

External links
About Prima Donna cheese
Dutch cheeses